Tandil Partido is a partido (Administrative territorial entity of Buenos Aires Province, Argentina) of Buenos Aires Province in Argentina.

Settlements

Tandil
María Ignacia
Gardey
De la Canal
Desvío Aguirre

Attractions

 Tandil Plaza Independencia 
 Tandil Lake  
 Piedra Movediza (Moving Rock)   
 Sierra del Tigre 
 Club Deportivo Santamarina, football club
 Tandil Hipódromo, horse racing venue
 Valle Escondido Club de Golf
 Tandil Aeroclub

Famous residents
 Mauro Camoranesi (October 4, 1976), footballer 
 Mariano González (May 5, 1981), footballer
 Guillermo Pérez Roldán (October 20, 1969), tennis player 
 Mariano Zabaleta (February 28, 1978), tennis player 
 Juan Martín del Potro  (September 23, 1988), tennis player
 Juan Mónaco  (March 29, 1984), tennis player
 René Lavand (September 24, 1928), magician
 Víctor Laplace (May 30, 1943), actor

Gallery

References

External links

Ciudad Tandil

 
Partidos of Buenos Aires Province
States and territories established in 1823